Viljo Aho (2 November 1932 – 23 February 2013) was a Finnish boxer. He competed in the men's welterweight event at the 1960 Summer Olympics.

References

1932 births
2013 deaths
People from Vyborg District
Finnish male boxers
Olympic boxers of Finland
Boxers at the 1960 Summer Olympics
Welterweight boxers